Rinnat Ibragimovich Safin (29 August 1940 – 22 October 2014) was a Soviet biathlete. At the 1972 Winter Olympics in Sapporo, he won a gold medal with the Soviet relay team.

Biathlon results
All results are sourced from the International Biathlon Union.

Olympic Games
1 medal (1 gold)

World Championships
6 medals (4 gold, 2 silver)

*During Olympic seasons competitions are only held for those events not included in the Olympic program.

References

1940 births
2014 deaths
Tatar people of the Soviet Union
Soviet male biathletes
Biathletes at the 1972 Winter Olympics
Olympic biathletes of the Soviet Union
Medalists at the 1972 Winter Olympics
Olympic medalists in biathlon
Olympic gold medalists for the Soviet Union
Biathlon World Championships medalists
Burials at Serafimovskoe Cemetery